Elizabeth Bouvia (born c. 1958) is a figure in the American right-to-die movement.  Her case attracted nationwide attention in this area as well as in medical ethics.

History
On September 3, 1983, Bouvia, at the age of 26, admitted herself into the psychiatric ward of Riverside General Hospital in Riverside, California. She was almost totally paralysed by cerebral palsy and had severe degenerative arthritis, which caused her great pain.

Bouvia was alienated from her family and husband, and had been entertaining thoughts of suicide. She requested hospital authorities to allow her to starve to death.  When they refused and ordered her to be force-fed, Bouvia contacted the American Civil Liberties Union, which assigned her a lawyer. In the subsequent lawsuit, the court upheld the hospital's decision and ordered force-feeding to continue (Pence 64-65).

Appeal
Following the court case, a bitter dispute broke out among physicians regarding the Bouvia case. Bouvia tried to resist the force-feeding by biting through the feeding tube. Four attendants would then hold her down while the tubing was inserted into her nose and liquids pumped into her stomach.

Some physicians called this battery and torture, while others claimed that the hospital was right to err on the side of continued life (Pence 65).

Bouvia appealed the lower court ruling and lost. Now, in addition to the force-feeding, she was hooked up to a morphine drip to ease the pain of her arthritis. In 1986, she appealed again and this time the court ruled in her favour that the force-feeding constituted battery.

Outcome
After the court case, Bouvia decided that she would live. However, her statements  made it clear that it was because of the pain of starvation and that she actually wished she was dead.

In 1992, Bouvia's lawyer Richard Scott tragically committed suicide. In an interview with the Los Angeles Times after his suicide, Bouvia stated that she had gone on morphine after the original court ruling in 1983. She stated that side effects of the morphine made starvation unbearable and expressed bitterness that the 1983 ruling had gone against her. She stated that she had been strong enough to starve herself to death in 1983 and said that she never would have gone on morphine if she had known she would eventually get a court ruling in her favor.

In 1998, she appeared on 60 Minutes, saying that she was still in pain and had felt great pressure to continue living; she expressed the hope that she would soon die of natural causes. She was still living in 2002. In its obituary for USC professor Harlan Hahn, the Los Angeles Times on May 11, 2008, reported that Bouvia was still alive. Doctors in 1986 had predicted she could only live for another 15 to 20 years.

References
Miller, Franklin and Diane Myer. "Voluntary Death: A Comparison of Terminal Dehydration and Physician Assisted Suicide" Thomas Mappes and Jane Zembaty Eds. Social Ethics (6th Ed). Boston: McGraw Hill, 2002. 99-104.
Gregory Pence. Chapter 2,  "Elizabeth Bouvia," pp. 19–24, Classic Cases in Medical Ethics| (8th Ed. New York: McGraw Hill, 2017).

Euthanasia activists
People from Riverside, California
1950s births
Living people
Activists from California
Death in Riverside County, California
21st-century American women